Goodwood Cricket Club is a Sunday cricket team that play in the grounds of Goodwood Park, near Chichester. The ground overlooks Goodwood House and is owned by the Duke of Richmond and Gordon.

It is thought to be one of the oldest cricket clubs in the world. A receipt for brandy in 1702, held at Goodwood House, records the first reference to cricket at Goodwood. Charles Lennox, 2nd Duke of Richmond, known as the Duke who was Cricket, (John Marshall 1961) was a leader in developing the game around Sussex. His enthusiasm was continued by Charles Lennox, 4th Duke of Richmond who was one of the original backers of Thomas Lord, founder of Lord's Cricket Ground. Teams that have come under the auspices of Goodwood Cricket are the Duke of Richmond's XI, Lord March's XI, the Goodwood Cricket Club XIs and the Goodwood Staff XI . The cricket club was resurrected by the 4th Duke in 1813.

Today, Goodwood CC is run by a group of volunteers. The Club formed an alliance in 2017 with Chichester Priory Park CC, whose 1st and 2nd XIs play at the ground on Saturdays.

History 
As early as 1622 two young men were reprimanded for playing with a cricket ball in Boxgrove churchyard on a Sunday.  In 1702 the 1st Duke of Richmond gave brandy for Arundel men following a cricket match.  By the 1720s the Duke of Richmond's XI were playing all over Sussex, including a match against Sir William Gage's team at Firle Place near Lewes. In 1727 some rules or ‘Articles’ of cricket were drawn up for matches between the 2nd Duke of Richmond's XII (unusually, the number in this particular instance) and Mr Brodrick's men, the first at Peper Harow, near Godalming, on 27 July 1727 and the second at Goodwood on 28 August. Despite the detail of the new rules, there was an easy let out for the two captains: ‘These rules do not apply to the Duke of Richmond or Mr Brodrick.’  These ‘Articles’ of cricket, kept in the Goodwood archive, are the earliest known written rules of cricket in existence.

From about 1749 matches were played regularly at Goodwood, ahead of all other locations to claim to be the first.  In 1746 an annual ‘Crickett Plate’ was being arranged. The winners would have ‘11 black velvet caps.’ Competition was to be fierce: ‘…a true cricket match should have as much solemnity as a battle.’ The game subsequently spread west from Sussex, via nearby Slindon, to Hambledon in Hampshire where it was famous from the 1750s.  It continued to be a favourite game of the 3rd Duke (who led an XI against Hambledon for £1,000 guineas in 1768) and of the 4th Duke, who as a young man was a prime mover in the foundation of the MCC, approaching Thomas Lord to find a suitable site.  A military man and great sportsman, the 4th Duke also found that cricket matches were an ideal way to get to know his soldiers.  The 5th Duke of Richmond was President of the MCC and the 10th Duke of Richmond was President/Patron of Sussex CCC. Another link with Lord's could be the club colours. These colours are the racing colours of the Dukes of Richmond and long after their use by the Dukes and the cricket club, they also became the colours of the MCC around 1888.

There has been one 1st class match at Goodwood; this was played on 22–23 July 1814 between Lord Frederick Beauclerk’s XI and George Osbaldeston's XI. The match was scheduled for three days but was over in two.  A total of 265 runs were scored in 4 innings, 44 wickets taken and Osbaldeston's XI won by 17 runs.
The Goodwood cricket ground is overlooked by some magnificent Cedars of Lebanon, planted by the 3rd Duke of Richmond in 1761.  One of these is known as the ‘Sheep Shearing Tree’ because of the competitions that were held beneath its mighty branches.

Over Goodwood's long cricketing history, illustrious players such as James Lillywhite (Captain of England) and, in more recent times, Sir Colin Cowdrey, Ted Dexter, Jim Parks, John Snow, Peter Moores, Devon Malcolm, Graham Gooch, Nasser Hussain and Jofra Archer have played at Goodwood.

Goodwood also has strong links with Priory Park.  In 1824, the 5th Duke of Richmond purchased the freehold of Priory Park from the Corporation of Chichester for £400. He had earlier purchased the leasehold for some £5,000. In December 1850 the Duke leased all the grounds to the Priory Park Society to be used as a private park.  The lodge was built and the stables of the old house, which the Duke had demolished in 1838, were converted into a Refreshment Room with an added veranda.  At the same time walks were constructed and the cricket pitch and the bowling green were laid out.  Members of the Society formed the Priory Park Cricket Club in May 1851 and the Society Sports Ground was opened.  Both the 6th and 7th Dukes continued to lease the ground to the Priory Park Society until 1918 when the Society agreed to surrender the lease if the Corporation of Chichester, to whom the 7th Duke conveyed the land, would take over financial responsibility for the Park. The Duke then presented the Park to the city as a War Memorial.  In 2017 Chichester Priory Park CC and Goodwood CC formed an alliance to work together.
Goodwood played in The National Village Cricket Championships from 1998 to 2003. Over recent years, there has been much investment in the pavilion and ground, the square being completely renovated in 2018.  The square, ground and pavilion are all maintained voluntarily by the club members.

In August 1826, the Hampshire Telegraph and Naval Chronicle reported that "[a] Grand Match of Cricket was played in Goodwook Park, yesterday, by Lord Dunwich and ten Noblemen and Gentlemen, visitors at Goodwood House, against eleven of the Goodwood Cricket Club for 500 sovereigns", with the club members winning by a score of 157 to 150.

Related people

The club has played host to a variety of players, including:

       James Lillywhite, Captain of England (employee of the Duke)
	Sir Colin Cowdrey
	Ted Dexter
	Jim Parks (cricketer, born 1931)
	John Snow	
	Allan Wells
	Ian Salisbury
	Graham Gooch
	Nasser Hussain
	Adam Zampa
       Ray Lindwall
       Devon Malcolm 
       Gladstone Small 
       Simon Jones 
       Adam Hollioake 
       Nick Compton 
       Sam Robson
       Jofra Archer played at Goodwood for Middleton CC v Goodwood CC 27.7.2014 https://goodwood.play-cricket.com/website/results/2343826

Club developments

An enormous Lebanon Cedar (31m/101 feet high) tree overlooks the club; it was planted in 1761.

Grounds
Recent developments have seen the arrival of electric and a bar in 1989, showers in 1991, sight-screens and an enlarged social area in 1996, a new artificial net in 1997, a new scoreboard in 1998, a 3-ton roller in 1999, a roll-on roll-off covers in 2000, replaced in 2018, additional flat sheet covers in 2015, a brand new roller in 2016, additional sight-screens in 2018 and the square was completely relaid in September 2018. The ground is all maintained by voluntary help with support from the Estate.

Special games and events

One of the oldest fixtures is the all day game against London New Zealand Cricket Club which was first played in 1955. 2016 saw the reinstatement of a match against the 10th Duke of Richmond's XI organised and captained by his grandsons.

External links

The Goodwood Cricket Club Website- (Play Cricket.com)

References

 The Duke who was Cricket; John Marshall; 1961 John Muller Ltd
 Glorious Goodwood; James Peill; 2019 Constable
 Double Century; Tony Lewis 1987 Hodder & Stoughton

Goodwood estate
Cricket grounds in West Sussex
English cricket venues in the 18th century
Sports venues completed in 1702
1702 establishments in England